Kafr El Hubi is a village in the Faqous administrative division of the Sharqia Governorate, Egypt. The village is named after the El Hubi family, the oldest and the biggest in the village.

Villages in Egypt
Populated places in Sharqia Governorate